Obstetrical nursing, also called perinatal nursing, is a nursing specialty that works with patients who are attempting to become pregnant, are currently pregnant, or have recently delivered. Obstetrical nurses help provide prenatal care and testing, care of patients experiencing pregnancy complications, care during labor and delivery, and care of patients following delivery. Obstetrical nurses work closely with obstetricians, midwives, and nurse practitioners. They also provide supervision of patient care technicians and surgical technologists.

Obstetrical nurses perform postoperative care on surgical units. Stress test evaluations, cardiac monitoring, vascular monitoring, and health assessments are somethings these nurses might preform. Obstetrical nurses are required to possess specialized skills such as electronic fetal monitoring, nonstress tests, neonatal resuscitation, and medication administration by continuous intravenous drip.

Obstetrical nurses are also expected to be detailed and organized because they usually have more than one patient to deal with at a time. Their mental and physical strength is important because the nurses work long hours usually standing and also have to be able to perform tasks expertly. Nurses should be emotionally stable because they will have to cope with emergencies and loss. Lastly, they need to have critical thinking skills because the patient's health could change in an instant and they have to be ready to know what to do quickly and accurately. 
 
Obstetrical nurses work in many different environments such as medical offices, prenatal clinics, labor & delivery units, antepartum units, postpartum units, operating theatres, and clinical research.

In the U.S. and Canada, the professional nursing organization for obstetrical nurses is the Association of Women's Health, Obstetric and Neonatal Nursing (AWHONN).

Certification for obstetrical nurses  
The National Certification Corporation (NCC) offers certifications for obstetrical nurses. These include RNC-OB (Inpatient Obstetrics), a certification that allows graduate nurses who have completed a bachelor's degree in the US or Canada, who want to expand into obstetrics. It is an online exam that costs around $325, and by the end of it they will gain themselves RNC-OB certificates. RNC-MNN (Maternal Newborn Nursing) is another online exam that is for certified registered nurses, who have completed their bachelor's degrees in Nursing and have gained experience in the area of newborn nursing, and are wanting to gain a certification/qualification in the area. The test costs approximately $325 and they have a 90-day window to complete the actual exam and C-EFM (Electronic Fetal Monitoring). This certification is also an online certification exam, for US and Canadian graduate nursing students. To do the online certification they are required to be either a licensed registered nurse, nurse practitioner, nurse midwife, physician, physician assistant, or paramedic, according to the US and Canada requirements.

Australian certification and requirements 
Bachelor's degrees in either nursing and/or midwifery are required to become an obstetrical or perinatal nurse in Australia. In Australia alone there are 32 different universities that offer nursing as an undergraduate degree, such as Australian Catholic university, Charles Darwin University and the University of Notre Dame in Australia. Once completing their degree, they are required to complete their master's degree in nursing. Bachelor's degrees and jobs as licensed nurses/midwives are required in order to be accepted for the master's degree.  There are 24 different universities in Australia that offer a master's degree in nursing, including Edith Cowan University, Monash University, James Cook University and University of Canberra.

References

External links
 Association of Women's Health, Obstetric and Neonatal Nurses
 National Certification Corporation

Nursing specialties
Obstetrics